Grace Jones' discography consists of 10 studio albums, eight compilation albums and 53 singles.

Jones began her recording career in 1975 with a disco song "I Need a Man" which became her first number one on Billboard'''s Hot Dance Club Songs chart two years later. She has since topped this chart with "Slave to the Rhythm" in 1985, "Love on Top of Love" in 1989 and "Sex Drive" in 1993, scoring four number one club hits in the United States, with a total of 17 entries on this chart. The singer also holds six entries on the US R&B chart, the most successful being "Pull Up to the Bumper" at number five. Internationally, her most successful single in terms of commercial performance is arguably the 1985 "Slave to the Rhythm".

Jones achieved chart prominence with her 1981 breakthrough album Nightclubbing which entered top 10 in five countries and was her first album to receive recording certifications for its sales. Jones' commercially most successful album to date remains her 1985 compilation Island Life, the only album chart-topper of her career.

Albums
Studio albums

Compilation albums

Singles

Other charted songs

Guest appearances

Videography

Video albums
 1982: A One Man Show 1983: The Video Singles''

Music videos

References

External links
 Grace Jones on Allmusic
 Grace Jones on Discogs
 Grace Jones on Rate Your Music

Discographies of American artists
Discographies of Jamaican artists
Pop music discographies
Rhythm and blues discographies
Rock music discographies
Discography
Soul music discographies
Reggae discographies
Disco discographies